Billingshurst is a village and civil parish in the Horsham District of West Sussex, England.

Toponymy 
The village's name derives from Anglo-Saxon and means 'a wooded hill of Billa's people', most likely referring to the sandstone hillock that St Mary's Church is sited on in the historical centre of the village. 'Bill' is the head of a family, 'ing' means of the people, and 'hurst' means wooded hill. It is most likely that it was a small family settlement, not yet being a large community or a parish, headed by one 'Billa' – someone of unestablished origin, and not by a populous Saxon tribe.

Community facilities 
The village has a secondary school and a sixth form college, known together as The Weald School. Billingshurst Primary School (formerly separate infant and junior schools, amalgamated in 2010) is situated near The Weald.

New housing development on the eastern side of the village will include a spine road linking the A29 road north of the village with the A272 road to the east. 550 new homes will be built along with a school, dentists' surgery, play areas and improvements to the railway station.

Transport 
Billingshurst is at the junction of the A29 and the A272 which are routes to Petworth, Petersfield, Haywards Heath, Pulborough and Bognor Regis.

Billingshurst railway station on Station Road is on the mainline from London Victoria to Bognor Regis and Chichester between Christ's Hospital railway station and Pulborough railway station.

The village is to the east of a remaining section of the Wey and Arun Canal; the canal has not been fully navigable since the 1890s.

Religious sites 
Billingshurst has four churches. St Mary's Church (Church of England) is the oldest, with a mix of service styles, ranging from Book of Common Prayer communion services to informal family worship. Other churches are St Gabriel's Church (Catholic), Billingshurst Family Church (Evangelical; part of the Commission family of churches) and Trinity Church (United Reformed).  Billingshurst Unitarian Chapel, set back behind the High Street, was founded in 1754 and is one of south-east England's oldest Nonconformist places of worship.

Sport 
The local football team is Billingshurst FC based at Jubilee Fields on the western junction of the A29 and A272. The club was established in 1891 and is running senior sides and a youth section with teams running from Under 8's through to U16s.

Second World War 
Kingsfold Camp, a prisoner-of-war camp, was set up in Billingshurst during the Second World War (see List of World War II prisoner-of-war camps in the United Kingdom).

Notable people 

 Paul Darrow (1941–2019), actor and author, lived in Billingshurst
 Edward Enfield (1929–2019), television and radio presenter, newspaper journalist, and educational administrator, lived in Billingshurst
 Harry Enfield (1961–), comedian, lived in Billingshurst
 Janet Lees-Price (1943–2012), actress, lived in Billingshurst
 Pom Oliver (1952–), filmmaker and arctic explorer, lived in Billingshurst
 Frank Patterson (1871–1952), illustrator, lived in Billingshurst
 Connor Swindells (1996–), actor, lived in Billingshurt
 James Tilley (1998–), footballer, born and lived in Billingshurst and went to school in Billingshurst at The Weald School

Film and cultural appearances 
 Billingshurst's Dell Lane was the location for the BBC sitcom Ever Decreasing Circles starring Richard Briers.
 Michael Lugg (1956) in British Pathé "Boy's Traction Engine"
 Paul Adorian (1965) in British Pathé "Vintage Fire Brigade"

References

Citations

Bibliography

External links 

Billingshurst Parish Council
Further information and sources on GENUKI

Villages in West Sussex